Dennis Butler Fry (3 November 1907 – 21 March 1983) was a British linguist and Professor of Experimental Phonetics at University College London. Through experiments he conducted in the 1950s and 1960s, Fry demonstrated that lexical stress correlated with loudness, pitch, and length of the affected vowel.

Books
 Fry, D.B. (ed.) (1976). Acoustic phonetics: a course of basic readings. Cambridge: CUP
 Fry, D.B. (1977). Homo loquens: man as a talking animal. Cambridge: CUP
 Fry, D.B. (1979). The physics of speech. Cambridge: CUP
 Fry, D.B. and Kostić, Đ. (1939). A Serbo-Croat phonetic reader. London: University of London Press
 Whetnall, E. and Fry, D.B. (1964). The deaf child. London: Heinemann
 Whetnall, E. and Fry, D.B. (1970). Learning to hear. London: Heinemann

See also
Daniel Jones (phonetician)
A. C. Gimson

References

1907 births
1983 deaths
Linguists from England
British phonologists
Phoneticians
Linguists of English
Academics of University College London